Yalda, a Night for Forgiveness, original title Yalda, is a 2019 Iranian drama film directed by Massoud Bakhshi.

Plot
The storyline of is based on an actual top-rated Iranian reality television show. In this story, a young woman convicted of the murder of her much older husband faces the next-of-kin of the victim (his daughter), who has the power to grant her forgiveness and save the perpetrator from the death penalty. The young woman must plead for her life, while viewers can vote by sms to help avoid the penalty by getting the sponsors to pay for the blood money.

The actual TV show Mah-e Asal (meaning “Honey Moon”), aired daily from 2007 to 2018 during the Islamic religious festival of Ramadan, and  often collaborated with Iran’s judicial system, which is based on Islamic law and includes the "eye for an eye" principle. The film has been transposed to Yaldā Night, an Iranian festival celebrated on the night of the winter solstice in the Northern Hemisphere.

Cast
 Sadaf Asgari
 Behnaz Jafari
 Babak Karimi
 Arman Darvish
 Fereshteh Hosseini
 Bahram Afshar

Awards
The film won the Grand Jury Prize for the World Cinema Dramatic Competition at the 2020 Sundance Film Festival, it won also the Grand prix Cinéma award of ELLE magazine, Best director award of Antalya international film festival 2020, Best Screenplay at the Sofia International Film Festival, Best script in Barcelona international film festival and the circle award in Washington DC film festival. It was also nominated for Lumiere award (equal to Golden Globe) in France and in various categories at the Bergen International Film Festival, Berlin International Film Festival, Pingyao International Film Festival, and was selected for the Adelaide Film Festival, Thalin International Film Festival, Warsaw International Film Festival, Brisbane International Film Festival, Lugano International Film Festival, Luxembourg International Film Festival, Helsinki International Film Festival, Vancouver International Film Festival, Cork International Film Festival among others .

References

External links

 
 
 

2019 films
2019 drama films
Iranian drama films
2010s Persian-language films
Sundance Film Festival award winners